Neil Whitaker (9 April 1931 – 4 October 2008) was an Australian rules footballer who played with Melbourne in the Victorian Football League (VFL).

Notes

External links 

1931 births
2008 deaths
Australian rules footballers from Victoria (Australia)
Melbourne Football Club players
Ivanhoe Amateurs Football Club players